Blattellaquinone, also known as gentisyl quinone isovalerate, is a sex pheromone of the German cockroach (Blattella germanica). Blattellaquinone is secreted by females to attract male cockroaches.

References

External links 
 Trapping roaches with biochemistry

Insect pheromones
Cockroaches
1,4-Benzoquinones